Fawn Hall (born September 15, 1959) is a former secretary to Lieutenant Colonel Oliver North and had a role in the Iran-Contra affair by helping North shred confidential documents.

Early life
Born in Annandale, Virginia, in 1959, Hall graduated from Annandale High School in 1977. She began working part-time in a clerical position for the United States Navy, beginning in January 1976 while she was in VGA high school. After graduating, she began working full-time for the Navy at the Pentagon.

Involvement in Iran-Contra
Hall was detailed from the Navy to work at the National Security Council on February 26, 1983, as Oliver North's secretary. She worked for North until she was fired on November 25, 1986, at the height of the scandal. Hall's mother, Wilma Hall, was secretary to Robert McFarlane, Reagan's national security advisor, North's superior and a major player in the Iran-Contra affair.

In one mishap, Hall transposed the digits of a Swiss bank account number, resulting in a contribution from the Sultan of Brunei to the Contras being credited to a Swiss businessman's bank account instead of the intended account.

In June 1987, Hall, herself, began two days of testimony in front of the United States Congress. She confessed to altering, shredding a large number of documents (so much was destroyed, she said, that the office shredder jammed), and smuggling others in her boots and inside her clothing and giving them to North on November 25, 1986, who was fired after his role in orchestrating potentially illegal aid to the Nicaraguan Contras became public. Among her other testimony was a claim that, "Sometimes you have to go above the law." Journalist Bob Woodward recorded that her legal defense justification was summarized in her words: "We shred everything". In 1989, in exchange for her testimony against North for Iran-Contra affair, she was granted immunity from prosecution.

Life after the Iran-Contra affair
After the Iran-Contra affair broke, Hall briefly went back to work for the Navy in 1987 for less than 6 months. She was invited to the 1987 White House Correspondents' Dinner by journalist Michael Kelly. After her congressional testimony in June 1987, she left government service and signed with the William Morris Agency and unsuccessfully pursued a media career in the Washington, D.C., area. She later moved to Los Angeles, California, and pursued a modeling career for several years. In April 1993, she married Danny Sugerman, former manager of The Doors. In 1987 Hall dated the actor Rob Lowe who tracked her down after seeing her at the Oliver North trial.

The Sugermans lived in the Hollywood Hills. It was reported that Sugerman introduced Hall to crack cocaine shortly after their marriage. She developed an addiction and suffered a non-lethal overdose in 1994, following which she went into rehab. Sugerman died in 2005 of lung cancer, and in 2007 Hall listed the house for sale for almost $2.5 million.

As of 2012 Hall was living a quiet life in West Hollywood, working at a bookstore and staying out of the public eye.

References

Sources 
 Hall, North Trial Testimony, 3/22/89, pp. 5311–16, and 3/23/89, pp. 5373–80, 5385–87; Chapter 5 Fawn Hall 147
 Final Report of the Independent Counsel for Iran/Contra Matters Volume I - Investigations and Prosecutions: Lawrence E. Walsh, Independent Counsel, August 4, 1993; Washington, D.C.

External links 
 

1959 births
Living people
American women civil servants
Secretaries
Iran–Contra affair
Reagan administration personnel
People from Annandale, Virginia
Annandale High School alumni